Rebecca Wigfield is an English international bowls player.

Rebecca Wigfield has won two National Championships; in 2013 she won the National Two‐Wood Singles followed by the 2015 National Fours. In 2016, she won the Bowls England Women’s National Champion of Champions.

The bowler who represents Northamptonshire was part of the fours team with Wendy King, Jamie-Lea Winch and Ellen Falkner who won the silver medal at the 2016 World Outdoor Bowls Championship in Christchurch.

In 2015 she won the pairs and fours bronze medals at the Atlantic Bowls Championships and in 2019 she once again won the pairs bronze medal at the Atlantic Bowls Championships.

References

English female bowls players
1988 births
Living people
Bowls European Champions